Darin Olver (born March 5, 1985) is a Canadian-born German professional ice hockey left winger. He is currently playing for Schwenninger Wild Wings of the Deutsche Eishockey Liga (DEL).

Playing career
Olver played high school hockey at Eastview High School under head coach Mike Gibbons. Highly recruited out of Canada, he helped his high school team reach the Minnesota State High School Hockey Tournament in 2001. Olver played college hockey at Northern Michigan University and was a second round, 36th overall, NHL draft pick of the New York Rangers. Upon graduating from his collegiate career, Olver joined the Rangers American Hockey League affiliate, the Hartford Wolf Pack, on an amateur try-out to end the 2006–07 season.

Without an offer from the Rangers, Olver left for Germany, signing a one-year contract with the Fischtown Pinguins of the 2nd Bundesliga. Leading Fischtown with 56 points in 52 contests, Olver was picked up by DEL team, the Straubing Tigers.

With a season limited by injury and producing only 11 points, Olver left for the Augsburger Panther, signing a one-year contract on March 2, 2009. In the 2009–10 season, Olver broke out to be among the DEL leaders with 60 points, resulting in helping an unlikely Augsburg reach the finals for the first time in their DEL history and quickly earning a one-year extension on March 17, 2010.

Olver consolidated his position among the elite in Germany in the following 2010–11 season. Despite Augsburg returning to the bottom echelons of the DEL, Olver led the entire league with 47 assists and 70 points to be awarded the DEL's player of the year.

On May 2, 2011, Olver left Augsburg and signed with reigning champions Eisbären Berlin. He won back-to-back German championships with the Eisbären team in 2012 and 2013. Olver left Berlin after the conclusion of the 2016–17 season and signed with fellow DEL side ERC Ingolstadt.

After three seasons with Ingolstadt, Olver left as a free agent and was signed to a one-year contract to continue in the DEL with the Schwenninger Wild Wings on August 20, 2020.

International play
Olver made his debut on the German national team during the 2010 Deutschland Cup.

Personal 
Olver comes from a hockey family. His father, John, played in college and coached many teams in Canada and the United States, including two years as an assistant coach for Northern Michigan University while Darin played there. His younger brother Mark Olver also played hockey at Northern Michigan and most recently plays for Eisbären Berlin in Germany.

Olver's maternal grandparents immigrated from Germany to Canada; he received a German passport in 2007.

Career statistics

References

External links

1985 births
Living people
Augsburger Panther players
Canadian ice hockey left wingers
Eisbären Berlin players
Fischtown Pinguins players
Hartford Wolf Pack players
Ice hockey people from British Columbia
ERC Ingolstadt players
New York Rangers draft picks
Northern Michigan Wildcats men's ice hockey players
Schwenninger Wild Wings players
Sportspeople from Burnaby
Straubing Tigers players
Canadian expatriate ice hockey players in Germany